Burlington Railroad most commonly refers to the Chicago, Burlington and Quincy Railroad.

Burlington Railroad may also refer to:
Burlington, Cedar Rapids and Northern Railway
Burlington and Missouri River Railroad
Burlington Northern Railroad